Ahmad Abubakar Gumi is an Islamic cleric, scholar and former military officer with the rank of captain in the Nigeria Defence Academy (NDA). He is the current Mufti and mufassir at the Kaduna central mosque Sultan Bello.

Early life
Ahmad Gumi is the eldest son to late Shaykh Abubakar Gumi. He was born in Kano state. He came from a geneanalogy of islamic scholars with his father being the first Grand Khadi of the old Northern Region. His father was instrumental in the revivification of Islam in Northern Nigeria,  particularly under Sir Ahmadu Bello.

Education
Ahmad Gumi attended Sardauna Memorial College (SMC) for his senior secondary education. After secondary school he got admitted into the Ahmadu Bello University and after his graduation he was enlisted into the Nigeria Defence Academy. Gumi resigned from military service at the rank of Captain and moved to Saudi Arabia to further his Islamic education at the Umm al-Qura University where he studied Islamic Jurisprudence and Tafsir. His colleagues at the university included Abdur-Rahman As-Sudais, Saud Al-Shuraim. He also gives annual Ramadan Tafseer in Sultan Bello Mosque Unguwan sarki Kaduna.

Military career
He served in the Nigerian Army Medical Corp (NAMC) as a medical officer and he retired as a captain.

Bandits advocacy 
As a result of insecurities all over Nigeria, Ahmad Gumi strive to negotiate with kidnappers to lower their arms for a safety Nigeria, He use to enter jungle and forest reaching out to their various Bandits camps and hideout, dragging their attentions to submit to the will of Allah and not to keep on kidnapping or killing people for wealthy ransom, as Allah will grant them forgiveness if they repent.

This mission started on February when Ahmad Gumi attend a peace making mission in Zamfara State, Since that occasions, He has taken many preaching visits to Katsina, Kaduna and Niger states, urging bandits to stop attacking peoples.

When he heard about the abduction of Greenfield University kidnapping, He have successfully lead to the release of 27 abducted students of Greenfield University, after he heard that the situation of the students is critical. The kidnappers had previously killed five of the students and released one of them after a ransom was paid, they had threatened to kill the remaining hostages if a ransom was not paid before Wednesday as the expiration deadline.

Ahmda Gumi also met different kidnappers for the issues of people abduction seeking for their freedom, He met kidnappers on the issue of Kagara students in Niger State.

On different occasions, he called the attention of Kidnappers to drop their weapons by submitting to the will of Allah and to abide by the Nigerian Constitution, and to the Nigerian Government to pardon and grant amnesty for the seek of Nigerian people to live in peace and harmony without living in tension situations.

Criticism 
On Friday, June 25, 2021, the Department of Security Service (DSS) has invited the Ahmad Gumi for interrogation due to how he relate with the bandits across Nigeria for peace making.

See also 

 Abubakar Gumi

References

Living people
People from Kaduna State
1959 births
Nigerian Sunni Muslims
Hausa people
Maliki fiqh scholars
Nigerian Sunni religious leaders
Nigerian Muslim activists